Battlestar Galactica and Galactica 1980 are American science fiction television series, produced in 1978 and 1980 by Glen A. Larson and starring Lorne Greene, Richard Hatch and Dirk Benedict.

Series overview

Episodes

Battlestar Galactica (1978–79)

Galactica 1980 (1980)

Releases

Theatrical releases 
Between 1978 and 1981, episodes were edited into three feature-length films. The first film, Battlestar Galactica, was an edited version of the pilot, "Saga of a Star World", featuring some differences from the original televised episodes, including the death of Baltar. It was released in cinemas in Canada, Australia and continental Europe before its American TV premiere and, in 1979, it was released theatrically in the UK, Ireland and the US. The second film, Mission Galactica: The Cylon Attack, was a re-edited version of the episodes "The Living Legend" and "Fire in Space", which also differed from the broadcast versions, omitting several scenes from both episodes. In 1979, it was released theatrically in continental Europe and Japan, and in the UK and Australia in 1980. The third film, Conquest of the Earth (also called "Galactica III" on the German poster), was a similar edit, though this time its source episodes were from Galactica 1980. It was also released theatrically, in 1981, in Europe and Australia.

Television movies 
Following the cancellation of the series, all of the episodes from the original series were re-edited into television movies for syndication, including a third edit of the pilot. The four two-part episodes ("Lost Planet of the Gods", "Gun on Ice Planet Zero", "The Living Legend" and "War of the Gods") were all combined and expanded with about five minutes of scenes deleted from the original broadcasts. The remaining single episodes were edited into two-hour blocks, combining two episodes into a single narrative, occasionally including over-dubbed dialogue. The final TV movie, an expanded version of "Experiment in Terra" with some scenes from the Galactica 1980 episode "The Return of Starbuck", featured new footage of an astronaut finding Commander Adama's logbook, which retold the premise of the show. It is believed that this version of the episode was to be released as another theatrical film in other countries, but never materialized.

Notes

References 

 
 
Episodes 1978, 1980
 
Battlestar Galactia (1978, 1980)